The 2018 Belgian Athletics Championships was the year's national outdoor track and field championships for Belgium. It was held on 7 and 8 July at the King Baudouin Stadium in Brussels. 

The 10,000 m for men and women and the 3000 m steeplechase for women were held separately in Naimette-Xhovémont on 5 May. The hammer throw events took place in Nivelles. It served as the selection meeting for Belgium at the 2018 European Athletics Championships.

Results

Men

Women

References

 Results

External links
 French Belgian Athletics Federation website
 Flemish Belgian Athletics Federation website

Belgian Athletics Championships
Belgian Athletics Championships
Belgian Athletics Championships
Belgian Athletics Championships
Belgian Athletics Championships
Sports competitions in Brussels